The 1903–04 Colgate Raiders men's basketball team represented Colgate University during the 1903–04 college men's basketball season. The head coach was Ellery Huntington Sr. coaching the Raiders in his fourth season. The team finished with an overall record of 12–5.

Schedule

|-

References

Colgate Raiders men's basketball seasons
Colgate
Colgate
Colgate